The first round of the 2002–03 UEFA Cup was contested between 17 September and 3 October 2002. A total of 96 teams participated in this round, with the 48 winners advancing to the second round.

Format
In the first round, each tie was played over two legs, with each team playing one leg at home. The team that scored more goals on aggregate over the two legs advanced to the next round. If the aggregate score was level, the away goals rule was applied, i.e., the team that scored more goals away from home over the two legs advanced. If away goals were also equal, then thirty minutes of extra time were played, divided into two fifteen-minute halves. The away goals rule was again applied after extra time, i.e., if there were goals scored during extra time and the aggregate score was still level, the visiting team advanced by virtue of more away goals scored. If no goals were scored during extra time, the tie was decided by penalty shoot-out.

Qualified teams
The first round involved 96 teams: 39 directly qualified for this round (including the three Intertoto Cup winners), 41 advancing from the qualifying round, and 16 losers from the Champions League third qualifying round.

Seeding
The draw was held on 30 August 2002 in Monaco. Before the draw, the 96 teams were divided into 48 seeded and 48 unseeded teams, based on their 2002 UEFA club coefficients. For convenience of the draw and to avoid pairing of teams from the same association, the teams were distributed into six groups of sixteen teams, each containing an equal number of seeded and unseeded teams.
In the draw, a seeded team from each group was paired with an unseeded team from the same group. The first team to be drawn played the first leg at home.

Summary
The first leg matches were played on 17 and 19 September, and the second leg matches were played on 1 and 3 October 2002.

|}
1This match was played in front of an empty stadium as punishment to Partizan for earlier crowd trouble.

Matches

Paris Saint-Germain won 4–0 on aggregate.

Partizan won 6–4 on aggregate.

Legia Warsaw won 7–1 on aggregate.

Real Betis won 4–1 on aggregate.

Beşiktaş won 7–2 on aggregate.

Parma won 4–3 on aggregate.

Levski Sofia won 5–2 on aggregate.

2–2 on aggregate. Anderlecht won on away goals.

National București won 3–2 on aggregate.

Lazio won 4–0 on aggregate.

Hertha BSC won 1–0 on aggregate.

Ipswich Town won 2–1 on aggregate.

Boavista won 4–2 on aggregate.

Fenerbahçe won 6–4 on aggregate.

Sparta Prague won 4–0 on aggregate.

Austria Wien won 5–2 on aggregate.

3–3 on aggregate. Denizlispor won on away goals.

Viking won 5–4 on aggregate.

Hapoel Tel Aviv won 4–1 on aggregate.

Stuttgart won 8–2 on aggregate.

Dinamo Zagreb won 9–1 on aggregate.

Djurgården won 3–1 on aggregate.

3–3 on aggregate. Viktoria Žižkov won on away goals.

Vitesse won 2–1 on aggregate.

Leeds United won 2–1 on aggregate.

4–4 on aggregate. Amica Wronki won on away goals.

Sturm Graz won 8–6 on aggregate.

Ferencváros won 5–0 on aggregate.

Málaga won 1–0 on aggregate.

Bordeaux won 10–1 on aggregate.

Slovan Liberec won 4–2 on aggregate.

PAOK won 5–3 on aggregate.

Panathinaikos won 2–1 on aggregate.

Red Star Belgrade won 2–0 on aggregate.

Fulham won 3–2 on aggregate.

Wisła Kraków won 8–1 on aggregate.

APOEL won 3–1 on aggregate.

Celta Vigo won 2–1 on aggregate.

Werder Bremen won 10–2 on aggregate.

Celtic won 10–1 on aggregate.

Porto won 6–2 on aggregate.

Schalke 04 won 8–1 on aggregate.

Grasshopper won 4–3 on aggregate.

Deportivo Alavés won 5–1 on aggregate.

5–5 on aggregate. Anorthosis Famagusta won on away goals.

Midtjylland won 2–1 on aggregate.

4–4 on aggregate. Blackburn Rovers won on away goals.

Slavia Prague won 7–3 on aggregate.

Notes

References

First round